French Without Tears is a 1939 British comedy film directed by Anthony Asquith and starring Ray Milland. It was based on the 1936 play of the same name by Terence Rattigan, who also co-wrote the script.
An on-off working relationship between Asquith and Rattigan began with this film and continued over the next 15 years.

Plot
The love affairs are depicted of three young Englishmen at a language "cramming" school in the south of France. Diana, the sister of one of the boys, arrives in town to flirt with all of her brothers' schoolmates.

Cast
 Ray Milland as Alan Howard
 Ellen Drew as Diana Lake
 Janine Darcey as Jacqueline Maingot
 David Tree as Chris Neilan
 Roland Culver as Cmdr. Bill Rogers
 Guy Middleton as Brian Curtis
 Kenneth Morgan as Kenneth Lake
 Margaret Yarde as Marianne
 Toni Gable as Chi-Chi
 Jim Gérald as Professor Maingot
 Mantovani as Himself - Orchestra Leader

Critical reception
Sky Movies described a "sparkling version of Terence Rattigan's comedy play. The import of Ellen Drew and Ray Milland from Hollywood ensured the film's success world-wide." Writing for Allmovie, Hal Erickson wrote, "much of the wit and zest of the original stage production has been blunted for the screen, moving one critic to describe French Without Tears as 'Comedy Without Laughs'. In all fairness, however, the film does boast a hilarious drunk scene in a musty old French wine cellar."

References

External links
 

1939 films
1939 comedy films
British black-and-white films
British films based on plays
British comedy films
Films based on works by Terence Rattigan
Films directed by Anthony Asquith
Films with screenplays by Terence Rattigan
Films with screenplays by Anatole de Grunwald
Films with screenplays by Ian Dalrymple
Films set in France
Two Cities Films films
1930s English-language films
1930s British films